Stanborough School could refer to either of two schools in Hertfordshire, England:

 Stanborough School, Watford, a private Seventh-day Adventist school
 Stanborough School, Welwyn Garden City, a state comprehensive school